Beaver Lake Mountains is an  long mountain  in central and north Beaver County, Utah, United States adjacent the south border of Millard County.

The mountain is bordered on the east by the Beaver River, as it flows due-north past Milford and the small Milford Valley; the river leaves the southeast section of the Escalante Desert, but the Beaver River comes from the east, Beaver Valley and the south terminus of the Mineral Mountains-(Minersville Reservoir).

The Beaver River flows due north to meet the Sevier River, but agricultural use prevents continuous flow through the southwest Sevier Desert region.

Description
Adjacent to the northeast is Lime Mountain. (The lower elevation, and smaller Badger Knolls, are just east.)

Access
Utah State Route 21 traverses southwest of the range, and goes through The Big Wash, and the northeast foothills of the neighboring Star Range. The Rocky Range, southeast of Beaver Lake Mountains, has numerous unimproved road access points.

The northeast, and east sections of the range can also be accessed from the north-south road, Utah 257; to the southwest, the Rocky Range section is over the north-flowing Beaver River, so the access has to be from the north areas of the Milford townsite.

From the San Francisco Mountains, the Beaver Lake mountain can be easily accessed by unimproved roads.

See also

 List of mountains in Utah

References

External links

 Brownfield Tunnel Spring, east of Beaver Lake Mountains (Peak), (approx. range center), lat-long.com, (coordinates)

Mountain ranges of Beaver County, Utah
Mountain ranges of the Great Basin
Mountain ranges of Utah